Mark 'MJ' Johnson (born 23 May 1978) is a former professional Australian rules footballer who played for the Essendon Football Club and Fremantle Football Club in the Australian Football League (AFL).

Early life
Johnson is commonly known as "Mr. Sunbury", referring to the body building award he won as a teenager in his home town of Sunbury, Victoria.

Mark commenced his junior football with Diggers Rest Football Club, before moving to Sunbury Lions.

He was drafted to Essendon as a rookie after playing underage with the Calder Cannons in the TAC Cup competition.

AFL career
 
Johnson was elevated from the Essendon rookie list in 1998, playing his first game in 1999. He was part of the 2000 premiership side, and won the W.S. Crichton Medal in 2002.

Known for his toughness, Johnson was part of the midfield duo known as the "Johnson Boys" at Essendon, the other member being Jason Johnson. The two are not related, however Mark did have a brother who played in the AFL for Geelong, David Johnson.

He was a courageous player and sometimes his height and strength were underestimated by opposition players. He played every match in 2006 and was one of just three Essendon players to do so; the others being Brent Stanton and Scott Lucas.

On 15 October 2007, Essendon announced that 29-year-old Johnson was to be delisted by the club, giving him the option of nominating for the national draft. The decision to delist Johnson was unpopular to many Essendon fans who enjoyed Mark's 'hard at it' attitude to his footy.

In November 2007, Mark was training with rival club, the Kangaroos. In the 2007 AFL Draft however, he was drafted to West Australian club, Fremantle, where he was reunited with former Essendon teammates Dean Solomon, who was traded by Essendon in 2006, and Kepler Bradley, also delisted by the Dons at the end of the 2007 season.

Johnson brought up his 200th AFL game in round 14, coincidentally against his former side, Essendon, at Domain Stadium. His old club triumphed by four points. He later sustained a career ending shoulder injury and played his last game in round 22 against Collingwood, which Fremantle won by 24 points.

He later sought compensation from the Dockers for his injury.

Playing statistics

|- style="background-color: #EAEAEA"
! scope="row" style="text-align:center" | 1999
|style="text-align:center;"|
| 28 || 15 || 2 || 1 || 131 || 79 || 210 || 47 || 20 || 0.1 || 0.1 || 8.7 || 5.3 || 14.0 || 3.1 || 1.3
|-
! scope="row" style="text-align:center" | 2000
|style="text-align:center;"|
| 1 || 24 || 5 || 4 || 269 || 124 || 393 || 102 || 39 || 0.2 || 0.2 || 11.2 || 5.2 || 16.4 || 4.3 || 1.6
|- style="background:#eaeaea;"
! scope="row" style="text-align:center" | 2001
|style="text-align:center;"|
| 1 || 23 || 10 || 2 || 250 || 89 || 339 || 84 || 48 || 0.4 || 0.1 || 10.9 || 3.9 || 14.7 || 3.7 || 2.1
|-
! scope="row" style="text-align:center" | 2002
|style="text-align:center;"|
| 1 || 24 || 5 || 2 || 247 || 142 || 389 || 109 || 78 || 0.2 || 0.1 || 10.3 || 5.9 || 16.2 || 4.5 || 3.3
|- style="background:#eaeaea;"
! scope="row" style="text-align:center" | 2003
|style="text-align:center;"|
| 1 || 24 || 8 || 4 || 257 || 165 || 422 || 107 || 98 || 0.3 || 0.2 || 10.7 || 6.9 || 17.6 || 4.5 || 4.1
|-
! scope="row" style="text-align:center" | 2004
|style="text-align:center;"|
| 1 || 20 || 17 || 11 || 162 || 117 || 279 || 54 || 57 || 0.9 || 0.6 || 8.1 || 5.9 || 14.0 || 2.7 || 2.9
|- style="background:#eaeaea;"
! scope="row" style="text-align:center" | 2005
|style="text-align:center;"|
| 1 || 22 || 29 || 12 || 265 || 133 || 398 || 106 || 84 || 1.3 || 0.5 || 12.0 || 6.0 || 18.1 || 4.8 || 3.8
|-
! scope="row" style="text-align:center" | 2006
|style="text-align:center;"|
| 1 || 22 || 9 || 4 || 212 || 146 || 358 || 99 || 64 || 0.4 || 0.2 || 9.6 || 6.6 || 16.3 || 4.5 || 2.9
|- style="background:#eaeaea;"
! scope="row" style="text-align:center" | 2007
|style="text-align:center;"|
| 1 || 20 || 7 || 3 || 180 || 131 || 311 || 98 || 49 || 0.4 || 0.2 || 9.0 || 6.6 || 15.6 || 4.9 || 2.5
|-
! scope="row" style="text-align:center" | 2008
|style="text-align:center;"|
| 17 || 14 || 8 || 3 || 88 || 60 || 148 || 35 || 31 || 0.6 || 0.2 || 6.3 || 4.3 || 10.6 || 2.5 || 2.2
|- class="sortbottom"
! colspan=3| Career
! 208
! 100
! 46
! 2061
! 1186
! 3247
! 841
! 568
! 0.5
! 0.2
! 9.9
! 5.7
! 15.6
! 4.0
! 2.7
|}

References

External links

Essendon Football Club players
Essendon Football Club Premiership players
Fremantle Football Club players
Crichton Medal winners
1978 births
Living people
Australian rules footballers from Melbourne
Calder Cannons players
Perth Football Club players
One-time VFL/AFL Premiership players
People from Sunbury, Victoria